Lukas Frühstück (born 26 June 1991) is an Austrian Handball player for Bregenz Handball.

Career 
Lukas Frühstück has been playing handball for Bregenz since his youth with Bregenz Handball.

He played with Bregenz Handball in the EHF Champions League (2007/08, 2008/09, 2009/10, 2010/11) and the EHF Cup (2009/10, 2010/11, 2011/12, 2013/14, 2014 / 15).

Since 2016, he has played in the team squad of the Austria men's national handball team, where he is coached by Patrekur Jòhannesson.

Personal life 
His father Roland Frühstück is an Austrian politician for the Austrian People's Party (ÖVP) and manager.

Successes 
 Lukas Frühstück won three times the Handball Liga Austria championship with the Bregenz Handball team.

HLA balance sheet

References

1991 births
Living people
Austrian male handball players
People from Bregenz
Sportspeople from Vorarlberg